Qleiat (also spelled  Qulaya'at, Qlaiaat, Qliyat, Qleiaat or Kleiat) is a town and municipality in the Keserwan District of the  Keserwan-Jbeil Governorate of Lebanon. It is located 28 kilometers north of Beirut. Qleiat's average elevation is 1,050 meters above sea level and its total land area is 646 hectares. Its inhabitants are predominantly Maronite Catholic, with Christians from other denominations in the minority.

References

Populated places in Keserwan District
Maronite Christian communities in Lebanon